The Barlow River is a tributary of the Chibougamau River, flowing into the Regional County Municipality (RCM) of Eeyou Istchee Baie-James, Jamésie, in the administrative region of
Nord-du-Québec, in the province of Quebec, in Canada.

The course of the river successively crosses the townships of Plamondon, Richardson and Blaiklock. This river is also located in the Albanel Lakes Wildlife Sanctuary, Mistassini and Waconichi.

The upper part of the hydrographic slope of the "Barlow River" is accessible by a forest road from Chibougamau and going up to the North. The lower part is served by some forest roads that come from the south where passes route 113 which connects Lebel-sur-Quévillon to Chibougamau. This road goes south of Opémisca Lake.

The surface of the "Barlow River" is usually frozen from early November to mid-May, however, safe ice movement is generally from mid-November to mid-April.

Geography

Toponymy 
This hydronym evokes the memory of Alfred-Ernest Barlow (1861–1914). He is one of the three sons of renowned topographer Robert Barlow. Alfred-Ernest worked for the Geological Survey of Canada from 1883 to 1907. He gained a certain reputation in Montreal as a consulting geologist. He is the author of some 60 studies of Canadian geology, including the report on the region of Chibougamau which he wrote with Gwillim and Faribault; at the end of its research, this report was published in 1911 by the Quebec Department of Mines, in its English version. Its English version is a translation of Joseph Obalski, in 1912. Barlow perished in the sinking of the Empress of Ireland, opposite Sainte-Luce, Quebec, in 1914. The Geography Commission, the current Commission de toponymie du Québec formalized this toponym on December 12, 1939.{}

The toponym "Barlow River" was formalized on December 5, 1968, at the Commission de toponymie du Québec, at the creation of this commission

References

See also 

Rivers of Nord-du-Québec
Nottaway River drainage basin
Eeyou Istchee James Bay